XHCAA-FM is a radio station in Aguascalientes, Aguascalientes, Mexico. Broadcasting on 100.9 FM, XHCAA is owned by Radio Universal and carries the Stereorey format from MVS Radio.

History
XECAA-AM 950 received its concession on November 12, 1978. The station was originally located in El Puertecito and known as La Doble AA; in 2002, it moved its transmitter to the current site.

The station went through various formats, including Azul 95 (a format later revived on XHAC-FM) and Life FM. Ultimately, Radio Universal would work with MVS Radio, whose formats it carries in Aguascalientes, as part of a limited relaunch of Stereorey in several cities in the Bajío in 2014.

References

Radio stations in Aguascalientes